Stowaway on Board (Spanish:Polizón a bordo) is a 1941 Spanish comedy film directed by Florián Rey, co-starring Guadalupe Muñoz Sampedro and Ismael Merlo.

Plot 
Antonciño (Ismael Merlo) is planning to travel to America to find his love Rosiña (Lina Yegros), despite his poverty. He moves into the area under the pretense of being a rich man, with his friend Manucho (Antonio Casal). Rosiña, a younger and poor woman with dreams of buying a house, is unaware of Antonciño's activities. Matters become complicated as Antonio's poverty is discovered, along with Manucho's pretending to be poor. Rosiña remembers her friend Antonciño and becomes his lover again. Manucho throws a great party in the city for two days, causing trouble for the mayor (Salvador Videgain).

Reception 
Stowaway on Board was nominated for the best film of year in Spain.

References

Bibliography
 Bentley, Bernard. A Companion to Spanish Cinema. Boydell & Brewer 2008.

External links 
 

1941 films
1941 comedy films
Spanish comedy films
1940s Spanish-language films
Galicia (Spain) in fiction 
Films directed by Florián Rey
Films produced by Cesáreo González
Spanish black-and-white films
1940s Spanish films